Hanna Rose Hall (born July 9, 1984) is an American actress. She made her film debut in Forrest Gump (1994), and later appeared in Sofia Coppola's The Virgin Suicides (1999) and Rob Zombie's Halloween (2007).

Early life
Hall was born in Denver, Colorado. Her family moved into the mountains when she was two years old, but she remained in Colorado until age eighteen. After high school, she lived in Hawaii and Los Angeles before moving to Vancouver, British Columbia, where she attended the Vancouver Film School.

Career
When she was seven years old, Hall attended Nina Axelrod's open casting call for Robert Zemeckis's Forrest Gump. A few callbacks later, Hall was eventually cast as young Jenny Curran. This was followed by a role as an orphaned child in the 1996 television film Homecoming, co-starring Anne Bancroft.

Hall screen tested for the role of Lux Lisbon in Sofia Coppola's film adaptation of The Virgin Suicides, but was considered too young for the part so she was cast as Cecilia Lisbon instead. She appeared in several independent films following this, before being cast in Rob Zombie's remake of Halloween (2007) as Judith Myers. In 2009, she appeared in the independent comedy American Cowslip (2009), opposite Val Kilmer, Diane Ladd, and Cloris Leachman.

In 2012, Hall began working as a theater director in Venice, California, directing underground plays. She has also appeared on television series, including guest roles on Criminal Minds and Masters of Sex.

Filmography

Film

Television

References

External links
 
 

1984 births
Actresses from Denver
American child actresses
American film actresses
American television actresses
Living people
20th-century American actresses
21st-century American actresses